J. J. Eckert is an American football coach. He is the current head football coach at Northeastern State University in Tahlequah, Oklahoma. He was previously head coach at Kilgore College in Texas and Garden City Community College in Kansas. Eckert is also the son of long-time Northeastern State head coach Tom Eckert.

Playing career
In high school, Eckert was starting quarterback at Tahlequah High School for two seasons. He was also a Tulsa World All-Stater in 1993.

After a year at the University of Central Arkansas, Eckert transferred to Northeastern State University in 1994 to play quarterback under head coach Tom Eckert, his father. He was a part of the teams that won the NAIA National Championship in 1994 and were National Runner-Ups in 1995.

Coaching career
Eckert began his coaching career as a quarterback and wide receivers coach at Northeastern State in 1998. In 2000, he was hired by Jim Rieves at Kilgore College, a junior college in Kilgore, Texas, for the same position. The following season, he became Kilgore's offensive coordinator.

In 2005, Eckert became the head coach at Garden City Community College in Garden City, Kansas. During his two-year stint there, the Broncbusters won 13 games and made a bowl appearance.

In 2007 Eckert returned to Kilgore as their head coach. Over the next 12 seasons, he led Kilgore to a 72–53 record, two Southwest Junior College Football Conference championships, three regular season conference titles, and five bowl appearances. Eckert was awarded as  Conference Coach of the Year in 2018 after a 10-2 championship season.

In December 2018, Eckert returned to Northeastern State as their 20th head football coach.

Personal life
Eckert and his wife, Amanda, have three children. He is a citizen of the Cherokee Nation.

Head coaching record

Junior college

College

References

External links
 Northeastern State profile

Year of birth missing (living people)
Living people
American football quarterbacks
Northeastern State RiverHawks football coaches
Northeastern State RiverHawks football players
Junior college football coaches in the United States